House blessings (also known as house healings, house clearings, house cleansings and space clearing) are rites intended to protect the inhabitants of a house or apartment from misfortune, whether before moving into it or to "heal" it after an occurrence. Many religions have house blessings of one form or another.

Christianity 

In Christianity, house blessing is an ancient tradition, that can be found in Roman Catholicism, Orthodox Christianity, and some branches of Protestantism.  In Roman Catholicism, Lutheranism, Anglicanism, Methodism and Orthodoxy, they are usually performed by a pastor who may sprinkle holy water (depending on denominational tradition) as he walks through every room of the house, accompanied by the occupants of the house, whilst praying for the occupants.

House blessings date back to the early days of Christianity, and in Catholicism, the rite takes the form of a prayer, with intercessions and several benedictions. Blessed salt and incense may also be used. The Methodist The Book of Worship for Church and Home (1965) contains "An Office for the Blessing of a Dwelling". Matthew 2:11 says:"On coming to the house, they saw the child with his mother Mary, and they bowed down and worshiped him. Then they opened their treasures and presented him with gifts of gold and of incense and of myrrh." Consequently, Anglicans, Catholics, Lutherans, Methodists and Orthodox Christians often have their homes blessed at Epiphany, on January 6; this blessing often starts with the Christian custom of chalking the door and prayer at the home altar. The custom of the Epiphanytide house blessing commemorates the visitation of the Magi to the child Jesus. The rite may also be accompanied by a home enthronement, although this is a separate ceremony and is more focused on the consecration of the occupants of the home.

House blessings in the Pennsylvania Dutch Country take the form of printed cards, framed and hung on the walls of the sitting room, and trace their origins to similar practices in The Netherlands and Belgium.  Blessings, employed by Catholics and Protestants alike, usually incorporate a picture of Christ's crucifixion and a prayer "to the Sweet Name of Jesus and His dear saints".  Many of these were printed in Belgium, and Turnhout.

In Alsace, such blessings have origins in the Pestbriefe (pestilence letters) of the Middle Ages, sold at fairs to those wishing to protect themselves from disease, and the Feuerbriefe (fire letters) brought back by pilgrims from Cologne and containing intercessory prayers to the Three Kings (usually with the letters "CMB", for Caspar, Melchior, Balthasar, incorporated somewhere into the design) for God protecting their homes from fire and disaster.  Other blessings, found in Alsace and brought to Pennsylvania, include blessings of the entranceway to a house, stable blessings invoking Saint Leonard or Saint Blasius, blessings against Feuer und Brand addressed to Saint Agatha, and even blessings for house pets addressed to Saint Florentius.

Hinduism 
In the Hinduism, a house blessing is conducted always before the people move in. With a new house, this is after construction is finished, but in a purchased house it will be done after purchase but before moving in. The blessing is performed by a Hindu priest and varies greatly throughout India. In Gujarat, the blessing mainly consists of performing abhisheka to a murti, often of Lord Ganesha, which is performed by the house-holders while the priest chants mantras. In Tamil Nadu, the traditional house blessing comprises the chanting of mantras, the escorting of a cow through all of the rooms, and (finally) the boiling of some of the cow's milk in the kitchen. Cow urine (komiyam) is also used for bathing.

Buddhism 

The Kojangi house blessing ceremony requires one fresh whole red fish, rice with azuki beans (sekihan), a small bottle of sake, an unopened bag of rice, and a new bag of rock salt.`

In the Gurung culture of Nepal most families have a house blessing twice a year in March and October performed by a Lama priest. At the October blessing a new set of prayer flags are hung at the house (typically on a bamboo pole) with a blessing scarf tied at the top of the prayer flags and a mixture of grains in a bag tied at the bottom.

Mandaeism 
On Dehwa d-Šišlam Rabba ("Festival of the Great Shishlam, on the 6th-7th days of Daula, corresponding to Epiphany in Christianity), Mandaean priests visit households and give them myrtle wreaths to hang on their houses for the rest of the year to protect against evil. The households also donate alms to the priests.

See also 

 Sacramentals
 Exorcism in Christianity
 First footing
Polaznik

References

Further reading 
  — a guide to the etiquette of Greek Orthodox house blessing ceremonies

Ritual